Rubi Rahman (born 3 December 1946), is a Bangla Academy Literary Award (2010) winning poet and a former Jatiya Sangsad member of the Government of Bangladesh. Bhalobasar Kabita (1983), Je Jiban Fariger (1991), Kanpete Achi and Moumachi (2006) are her notable books of poetry.

References

1946 births
Living people
Bengali-language poets
Bangladeshi women poets
Bengali-language writers
Recipients of Bangla Academy Award
Recipients of Mazharul Islam Poetry Award
21st-century Bangladeshi women politicians
Women members of the Jatiya Sangsad
People from Chatkhil Upazila